The Rocky River is very short and small tributary of the Housatonic River in the U.S. state of Connecticut. It flows into the Housatonic River from the west just upstream from New Milford at 

Historically, the Rocky River flowed South from Sherman before looping northward to join the Housatonic River.  The historic Rocky River was dammed at its original junction with the Housatonic to create the Candlewood Lake reservoir.

See also
List of rivers of Connecticut

References 

Rivers of New Haven County, Connecticut
Rivers of Connecticut
Tributaries of Housatonic River